Events from the year 1955 in Taiwan, Republic of China. This year is numbered Minguo 44 according to the official Republic of China calendar.

Incumbents
 President – Chiang Kai-shek
 Vice President – Chen Cheng
 Premier – Yu Hung-chun
 Vice Premier – Huang Shao-ku

Events

January
 28 January – United States Congress authorizes President Dwight D. Eisenhower to use force to protect Formosa from the People's Republic of China.

May
 1 May – The end of First Taiwan Strait Crisis.

October
 31 October – The establishment of National School of Arts in Taipei County.

Births
 10 February – Cho Chun-ying, acting Mayor of Tainan (2001).
 29 March – Kong Jaw-sheng, Chairperson of Financial Supervisory Commission (2004–2006).
 7 April – Christina Liu, Minister of Finance (2012).
 13 May – Chen Ming-wen, Magistrate of Chiayi County (2001–2009).
 15 May – Andrew Yang, Minister of National Defense (2013).
 17 May – Pai Bing-bing, singer and actress.
 30 June – Hsu Yao-chang, Magistrate of Miaoli County.
 9 July – Wu Se-hwa, Minister of Education (2014–2016).
 27 July – Pan Shih-wei, Minister of Labor (2014).
 10 August – Shih Jun-ji, designated Vice Premier of the Republic of China.
 22 August – Jaclyn Tsai, Minister of Mongolian and Tibetan Affairs Commission (2013–2016).
 7 October – Thomas Lee, member of Legislative Yuan (2002–2005, 2012–2016).
 25 October – Chen Kuang-fu, Magistrate of Penghu County.
 29 October – Cyrus Chu, Minister of National Science Council (2012–2014).
 16 November – Chen Wen-Chi, President and CEO of VIA Technologies.
 25 November – Chen Ming-tong, Minister of Mainland Affairs Council.

References

 
Years of the 20th century in Taiwan